The men's 100 metres hurdles event at the 1991 Pan American Games was held in Havana, Cuba on 7 August.

Results
Wind: -1.7 m/s

References

Athletics at the 1991 Pan American Games
1991
Pan